Marowa  is a village of Nalbari district in Western Assam under 51(5) No Upar Barbhag Gram Panchayat.

Language 
The primary language used in Marowa is Kamrupi, as in Nalbari district and Kamrup region

See also
 Villages of Nalbari District

References

External links
 

Villages in Nalbari district